Parachiloglanis is a genus of catfish of the family Sisoridae.

Species
There are currently 5 recognized species in this genus:
 Parachiloglanis benjii Thoni & Gurung, 2018
Parachiloglanis bhutanensis Thoni & Gurung, 2014 (Khaling torrent catfish) 
Parachiloglanis dangmechhuensis Thoni & Gurung, 2018
Parachiloglanis drukyulensis Thoni & Gurung, 2018
 Parachiloglanis hodgarti (Hora, 1923)

References

Sisoridae
Freshwater fish genera
Catfish of Asia
Catfish genera